4709 Ennomos  is a large Jupiter trojan from the Trojan camp and the namesake of the small Ennomos family, approximately  in diameter. It was discovered on 12 October 1988, by American astronomer Carolyn Shoemaker at the Palomar Observatory in California. The relatively bright and possibly elongated Jovian asteroid belongs to the 40 largest Jupiter trojans and has a rotation period of 12.3 hours. It was named after Ennomus (Ennomos), a Trojan warrior killed by Achilles.

Orbit and classification 

Ennomos is a Jovian asteroid orbiting in the trailing Trojan camp at Jupiter's  Lagrangian point, 60° behind its orbit in a 1:1 resonance (see Trojans in astronomy).

It orbits the Sun at a distance of 5.1–5.4 AU once every 12 years (4,387 days; semi-major axis of 5.24 AU). Its orbit has an eccentricity of 0.02 and an inclination of 25° with respect to the ecliptic. The body's observation arc begins with a precovery taken at Palomar in August 1951, more than 37 years prior to its official discovery observation.

Small Ennomos family 

This Jupiter trojan is also the namesake of the Ennomos family (009), a small Jovian asteroid family with 30 known members. The family was first identified by Jakub Rozehnal and Miroslav Brož in 2011. It also includes 1867 Deiphobus, one of the largest Jovian trojans.

As the existence of this family is not well established, Ennomos is still considered part of the Jovian background population by another HCM-analysis (Knezevic and Milan). It is speculated that Ennomos might be an unrelated interloper in its own family rather than its parent body. As of 2018, only a few families have been identified among the Jovian asteroids. These are the Hektor family, the Eurybates family, and the Arkesilaos family as well as two unnamed families, 006 and 010).

Naming 

This minor planet was named by the discoverer from Greek mythology after the Trojan warrior Ennomus (Ennomos), who was one of many Trojans killed by Achilles in the waters of the River Skamander. The official naming citation was published by the Minor Planet Center on 28 April 1991.

Physical characteristics 

Ennomos is an assumed C-type asteroid. Its V–I color index of 0.69 is untypically low compared to most other large Jupiter trojans.

Rotation period 

In December 1990, a rotational lightcurve of Ennomos was obtained by Italian astronomers Stefano Mottola and Mario Di Martino using the 1.52-meter Loiano Telescope at the Observatory of Bologna in Italy. Lightcurve analysis gave a well-defined rotation period of 12.275 hours with a relatively high brightness amplitude of 0.47 magnitude, indicative of a non-spherical, elongated shape.

Between 2015 and 2017, photometric observations by Daniel Coley and Robert Stephens at the Center for Solar System Studies, California, gave several concurring periods of 12.267, 12.269 and 12.271 with an amplitude between 0.43 and 0.46 magnitude. This also supersedes a period form Stephens taken at the GMARS Observatory  in September 2011.

Diameter and albedo 

According to the surveys carried out by the Infrared Astronomical Satellite IRAS, the Japanese Akari satellite and the NEOWISE mission of NASA's Wide-field Infrared Survey Explorer, Ennomos measures between 80.03 and 91.43 kilometers in diameter and its surface has an albedo between 0.077 and 0.078. The Collaborative Asteroid Lightcurve Link derives an albedo of 0.0972 and a diameter of 81.23 kilometers based on an absolute magnitude of 8.6. Also, Rozehnal and Brož cite a high visual albedo of approximately 0.15 in their publication.

Notes

References

External links 
 Long-term evolution of asteroid families among Jovian Trojans, Jakub Rozehnal and Miroslav Brož (2014)
 Lightcurve Database Query (LCDB), at www.minorplanet.info
 Dictionary of Minor Planet Names, Google books
 Discovery Circumstances: Numbered Minor Planets (1)-(5000) – Minor Planet Center
 
 

004709
004709
Discoveries by Carolyn S. Shoemaker
Named minor planets
19881012